Haria (traditionally called Leawaka Amalatu) is one of the 17 villages on the island of Saparua, Maluku, Indonesia.

Pela relationships
Haria has a pela (traditional village connection) with the following villages:
Waesamu
Hative Besar
Lilibooi
Sirisori Amalatu

Important people
Pattimura/Kapitan Thomas Matulessy, one of the Indonesian heroes who helped to fight for independence.

References

Populated places in Maluku (province)
Saparua